Thilakarathne Bandara Ekanayake (ටී. බී. ඒකනායක; 28 August 1954 – 6 December 2020) was a Sri Lankan politician, a member of the Parliament of Sri Lanka and a government minister.

References
 

Sri Lankan actor-politicians
2020 deaths
Sri Lankan Buddhists
Members of the 10th Parliament of Sri Lanka
Members of the 11th Parliament of Sri Lanka
Members of the 12th Parliament of Sri Lanka
Members of the 13th Parliament of Sri Lanka
Members of the 14th Parliament of Sri Lanka
Sri Lanka Freedom Party politicians
United People's Freedom Alliance politicians
Sri Lanka Podujana Peramuna politicians
1954 births
Culture ministers of Sri Lanka